Jarius Hayes (born March 27, 1973) is a former American football tight end. He played for the Arizona Cardinals in 1996 and 1998.

References

1973 births
Living people
American football tight ends
North Alabama Lions football players
Arizona Cardinals players